Currie is a rural residential locality in the local government area (LGA) of King Island in the North-west and west LGA region of Tasmania. The 2016 census recorded a population of 768 for the state suburb of Currie.
It is the largest township on, and is the administrative centre of, King Island, at the western entrance to Bass Strait.

History 
Currie was gazetted as a locality in 1971.

Geography
The waters of the Southern Ocean form the western and south-western boundaries.
The town is situated just inland from a partly sheltered natural harbour on the west coast of the island, which was originally named Howie's Boat Harbour after David Howie, an early visitor and unofficial resident of the island in the 1840s. It was renamed after Archibald Currie (1830–1914), a Melbourne shipowner who purchased the remains of the full-rigged ship Netherby wrecked near there in 1866, and used the harbour as a base for salvage operations. The harbour was used for similar operations on later wrecks in the vicinity including the British Admiral in 1874 and Blencathra in 1875, the latter being wrecked right at the entrance to the harbour.  Currie Lighthouse was built here in 1879.

Increasing knowledge of the surrounding landscape led to permanent agricultural settlement very soon afterwards, mostly grazing beef and dairy cattle. It was, until the opening of the all-weather port of Grassy Harbour in 1974, the main port connecting the island with both Victoria and Tasmania. It is a significant centre for the fishing industry, especially rock lobster. There is also a nearby airport, King Island Airport, capable of handling medium-sized turbopropeller aircraft.

Road infrastructure 
Route B25 runs north from the town centre as Main Street and then as North Road. It also runs east as Grassy Road.

Climate
Currie has a very mild oceanic climate (Köppen Cfb) bordering on a Mediterranean climate (Csb) owing to its summers being drier than most of Tasmania. Winter frosts are extremely rare owing to the strong maritime influence (rarer than at Urandangi, over 18 degrees closer to the equator), whilst only three days per year will exceed . Owing to the strong westerly winds from the Southern Ocean, Currie’s weather on most days is cloudy and showery – over half of all days receive some rainfall, though seldom is it heavy, and only 25 days per year have cloud cover under one-eighth, with fewer than four such days on average even during the quite dry summer months.

References

Towns in Tasmania
King Island (Tasmania)